Raymond Russell (1887 – 1918) was an American actor during the silent film era.

Biography
Russell was born in Salina, Kansas in 1887. He made his first stage appearances in 1894 playing juvenile roles at the Dewey Theatre in Oakland, California.

Russell appeared in three films with the short-lived The Oz Film Manufacturing Company, all produced in 1914: The Patchwork Girl of Oz as Dr. Pipt, The Magic Cloak of Oz as Jikki, and His Majesty, the Scarecrow of Oz as King Krewl. He also appeared in The Gray Nun of Belgium from Dramatic Feature Films, Frank Joslyn Baum's renaming of the Oz Film Company.

References

External links 
 

1887 births
1918 deaths
American male film actors
Male actors from Kansas
American male silent film actors
20th-century American male actors